Shadwell Racing is the Thoroughbred horse racing operations of Sheikh Hamdan bin Rashid Al Maktoum, Deputy Ruler of Dubai, United Arab Emirates.

Introduced to Thoroughbred flat racing while a student in the United Kingdom, Sheikh Hamdan established his first racing stable there in 1981. Over the years he has invested heavily in both racing and breeding and has acquired major operations in England, Ireland and the United States.

He owns eight stud farms worldwide containing over 200 regally bred mares and many top stallions. Six of these are in the county of Suffolk, England, three near Thetford – Nunnery, Melton and Snarehill Studs – plus the Salsabil Stud near Bury St Edmunds, Elmswell Park Stud and Beech House Stud just outside Newmarket. The other two are Derrinstown Stud near Maynooth, County Kildare, Ireland, and the 3,200 acre Shadwell Farm near Lexington, Kentucky, United States.

The Nunnery Stud is where the whole British breeding operation is controlled and currently standing there are Eqtidaar, Muharaar, Mukhadaram and Tasleet. In the past legendary stallions such as Green Desert, Nashwan, Unfuwain, Haafhd, Nayef and Sakhee also stood there. Beech House Stud is used as a base for Shadwell's private mares, both Thoroughbred and Arabian. The paddocks are also used to winter the private Arabian young stock before they are broken in at Snarehill. Elmswell Park Stud and Salsabil Stud are located deep in the Suffolk countryside. These operations together look after Sheikh Hamdan's private mares. It is here that the mares are cared for prior to foaling, and then once they have foaled they stay until they return to Ireland with their foals in the late summer. The quiet surroundings of Salsabil Stud are ideal for the mares and foals at this early stage of the foals' development. The Snarehill Stud is used as a base for breaking in the young Thoroughbreds. It is also used for rest and rehabilitation for horses in training. Finally there is Melton Paddocks which was originally the public stud before the building of the Nunnery Stud, but now it houses the Arabian stallions.

The Shadwell Farm in Lexington, Kentucky, was constructed in 1985. At the farm's stallion division, Nashwan Stud, currently stand  Mohaymen, Qurbaan and Tamarkuz.

The Derrinstown Stud currently stands Awtaad, Haatef, Markaz and Tamayuz.

This investment has translated to great success on the race track. He was the British flat racing Champion Owner in 1990, 1995, 2002, and 2005. He has enjoyed over 50 Group 1 wins in Europe in addition to big race success in America, Australia and Dubai. His leading horses have ranged from sprinting champions such as Dayjur and Hamas, champion milers like Lahib and Bahri to great middle distance runners such as Nashwan, Unfuwain, Haafhd, Nayef, Jazil and Invasor. This is in addition to racing several classic winning fillies who have gone on to be great broodmares. The most famous being Salsabil who topped winning the Epsom Oaks by beating the colts in the Irish Derby. Shadwell's most famous broodmare is Height of Fashion who was sold by Queen Elizabeth II to Sheikh Hamdan Al-Maktoum after setting a new course record in the Princess of Wales' Stakes. She was the dam of Nashwan, Nayef and Unfuwain. She is also the grand dam of Ghanaati through her daughter Sarayir.

In England he currently has approximately 200 horses in training spread over a number of trainers including Michael Stoute, Owen Burrows, John Gosden, William Haggas, Marcus Tregoning, Ed Dunlop and Mark Johnston. In the past he sent horses with great success to Dick Hern, Michael Jarvis, Barry Hills, Alec Stewart, John Dunlop and Harry Thomson Jones. In Ireland he has sent his horses for many years to Kevin Prendergrast and Dermot Weld and likewise in France to Freddy Head. In the United States, Kiaran McLaughlin is a trainer for Sheikh Hamdan's stable.  David A. Hayes conditions horses for the sheikh in Australia. In the UAE American trainer Doug Watson is responsible for the sheikh's runners at the Dubai carnival.

In England he currently has Jim Crowley as his retained jockey. In the 1980s and 1990s, Willie Carson won many big races for Shadwell most famously on Nashwan and Salsabil.

In late 2005, his Shadwell Stable acquired the Argentina-bred and Uruguay-owned racehorse Invasor and brought him to race in the United States. Invasor won several major graded stakes races including the 2006 Breeders' Cup Classic and was voted the U.S. Horse of the Year and ranked No.1 in the World Thoroughbred Racehorse Rankings. He won them the Dubai World Cup but was retired in June 2007 following a non-life-threatening training injury and now stands as a stallion at Shadwell Farm in Kentucky. Shadwell Stables won the Eclipse Award for Outstanding Owner of 2007 thanks to the efforts of Invasor and leading filly Lahudood.

Major international racing wins
United Kingdom

2,000 Guineas:
 Nashwan (1989)
 Haafhd (2004)
Epsom Derby:
 Nashwan (1989)
 Erhaab (1994)
1,000 Guineas:
 Salsabil (1990)
 Shadayid (1991)
 Harayir (1995)
 Lahan (2000)
 Ghanaati (2009)
Epsom Oaks:
 Salsabil (1990)
 Eswarah (2005)
 Taghrooda (2014)
St. James's Palace Stakes:
 Marju (1991)
 Bahri (1995)
Coronation Stakes:
 Al Bahathri (1985)
 Ghanaati (2009)
Queen Anne Stakes:
 Lahib (1992)
Prince of Wales's Stakes:
 Muhtarram (1994 & 1995)
 Nayef (2003)
Ascot Gold Cup:
 Ashal (1990)
Eclipse Stakes:
 Nashwan (1989)
 Elmaamul (1990)
 Mukhadram (2014)
Falmouth Stakes:
 Al Bahathri (1985)
 Alshakr (2000)
 Tashawak (2002)
 Nazeef (2020)
King George VI and Queen Elizabeth Stakes:
 Nashwan (1989)
 Taghrooda (2014)
Sussex Stakes:
 Mohaather (2020)
 Baaeed (2022)
 Lockinge Stakes:
 Baaeed (2022)
International Stakes:
 Nayef (2002)
 Baaeed (2022)
Queen Elizabeth II Stakes:
 Lahib (1992)
 Maroof (1994)
 Bahri (1995)
Champion Stakes:
 Nayef (2001)
 Haafhd (2004)
King's Stand Stakes:
 Dayjur (1990)
 Battaash (2020)
Golden Jubilee Stakes:
 Atraf (1996)
 Malhub (2002)
July Cup:
 Hamas (1993)
 Elnadim (1998)
 Muhaarar (2015)
Nunthorpe Stakes:
 Dayjur (1990)
Haydock Sprint Cup:
 Dayjur (1990)
  Minzaal (2022)
Dewhurst Stakes:
 Alhaarth (1995)
 Mujahid (1998)
Middle Park Stakes:
 Fard (1994)
 Hayil (1997)
 Awzaan (2009)
Racing Post Trophy:
 Al Hareb (1988)
Lowther Stakes:
 Al Bahathri (1984)
Fillies' Mile:
 Aqaarid (1994)

Ireland
Irish Derby:
 Salsabil (1990)
Irish 2,000 Guineas:
 Awtaad (2016)
Irish 1,000 Guineas:
 Al Bahathri (1985)
 Mehthaaf (1994)
 Matiya (1996)
 Bethrah (2010)
Irish Champion Stakes:
 Elmaamul (1990)
 Muhtarram (1993)

France
Poule d'Essai des Pouliches
 Ta Rib (1996)
Prix Jean Prat
 Tamayuz (2008)
Prix Jacques Le Marois
 Tamayuz (2008)
Prix du Moulin de Longchamp
 Aqlaam (2009)
 Baaeed (2021)
Prix de l'Abbaye de Longchamp
 Dayjur (1990)
Prix Vermeille
 Salsabil (1990)
Prix Jean-Luc Lagardère
 Naaqoos (2008)
Prix Morny
 Arcano (2009)
Prix Marcel Boussac
 Ashayer (1987)
 Salsabil (1989)
 Shadayid (1990)

Australia
Melbourne Cup:
 At Talaq (1986)
 Jeune (1994)
Caulfield Cup:
 Tawqeet (2006)
Blue Diamond Stakes:
 Nadeem (2006)

United Arab Emirates
Dubai World Cup:
 Almutawakel (1999)
 Invasor (2007)
Dubai Duty Free Stakes:
 Altibr (1999)
Dubai Sheema Classic:
 Nayef (2002)
Godolphin Mile:
 Tereshkova (1996)
 Tamarkuz (2015)
Dubai Golden Shaheen:
 Atraf (1997)

United States
Belmont Stakes:
 Jazil (2006)
Breeders' Cup Classic:
 Invasor (2006)
 Metropolitan Handicap:
 Frosted (2016)
Pimlico Special:
 Invasor (2006)
Suburban Handicap:
 Invasor (2006)
Whitney Handicap:
 Invasor (2006)
 Frosted (2016)
Donn Handicap:
 Invasor (2007)
 Albertus Maximus (2009)
Breeders Cup Dirt Mile
 Tamarkuz (2016)
Breeders' Cup Filly & Mare Turf: 
 Lahudood (2007)
Flower Bowl Invitational Stakes:
 Lahudood (2007)
Queen Elizabeth II Challenge Cup Stakes:
 Alwajeeha (2008)

References
 Sheik Hamdan bin Rashid Al Maktoum at the NTRA
 Official horse racing website for Sheik Hamdan
 Official website for Shadwell Stud, Thetford, Norfolk, United Kingdom
 Official website for Shadwell Farm LLC, Lexington, Kentucky
 Official website for Kingwood House Stables
 Official website for Derrinstown Stud at Maynouth, Ireland
 January 21, 2008 NTRA article titled Shadwell wins Eclipse for top owner

External links
 Shadwell Stud (UK) official website
 Derrinstown Stud (IRE) official website
 Shadwell Farm (US) official website

Emirati racehorse owners and breeders
Horse farms in Ireland
Horse farms in the United Kingdom
Horse farms in Kentucky
Eclipse Award winners
Companies based in Lexington, Kentucky